Ganapathi Sundara Natciyar Puram is a village in Virudhunagar district in the Indian State of Tamil Nadu. Located between Rajapalayam and Tenkasi on NH208. The economy is based on agriculture. Authority: SUN TV NEWS 12.9.21.Natural beauty scenes are there in this village

Education
There is an elementary school.

References

Villages in Virudhunagar district